The Chief Veterinary Officer (or CVO) is an official in the British government, who is head of veterinary services in the United Kingdom.  Wales, Scotland and Northern Ireland also each have a Chief Veterinary Officer.

List of post holders for the United Kingdom
The following people have held the post of Chief Veterinary Officer for the United Kingdom:
Alexander Curtis Cope, 1893–1905
Sir Stewart Stockman, 1905–1926
Sir James Joseph Ralph Jackson, 1926–1932
Sir Percy John Luxton Kelland, 1932–1938
Sir Daniel Alfred Edmond Cabot, 1938–1948
Sir Thomas Dalling , 1948–1952
Sir John Neish Ritchie, 1952–1965
Mr John Reid, 1965–1970
Mr A G Beynon, 1970–1973
Mr A C L Brown, 1973–1980
Mr William Howard Rees, August 1980 – May 1988
Keith Meldrum, June 1988 – April 1997
James Scudamore, April 1997 – March 2004
Dr Debby Reynolds, March 2004 – November 2007
Fred Landeg, November 2007 – May 2008 (acting CVO prior to full appointment)
Mr Nigel Gibbens, 21 May 2008 – 28 February 2018
Christine Middlemiss, 1 March 2018 – present

List of post holders for Wales
Dr Christianne Glossop, June 2005 – present

List of post holders for Scotland
The Scottish post was created in October 2002, and the following people have held the post:
Leslie Gardner, October 2002 – March 2003
Charles Milne, March 2003 – June 2009
Simon Hall, June 2009 – June 2011
 Sheila Voas, June 2011– present (acting CVO prior to full appointment in October 2012)

List of post holders for Northern Ireland
Dr Robert (Bob) Milligan McCracken, 1998–2002
Mr R M Houston, 2002–2013
Mr Robert J Huey, 2013–present

References

External links
Government Veterinary Surgeons website
Department of Agriculture for Northern Ireland website

United Kingdom
Government occupations
Government of Northern Ireland
Government of Scotland
Government of Wales
Veterinary medicine in the United Kingdom
Veterinary professions